Netaji Subhash High Altitude Training Centre, commonly known as High Altitude Training Centre, is one of the academic wings of the Sports Authority of India and is in Hill city of Shilaroo which is 52 km from Shimla.

The training center is spread over the 78 acres at the altitude of 8000 feet and has all the equipment and other facilities for many sports. The main aim of this institute is to help the players to acclimatize to high altitude conditions.

History 
Founded in 1984, the Netaji Subhash High Altitude Training Centre was established by Sports Authority of India. After considering  locations, Shilaroo was selected due to climate conditions that will help players build endurance, stamina and quick recovery after the heavy training sessions.

The High Altitude Training Centre was established for the training of national players in sports such as boxing, hockey, wrestling, judo, and gymnastics.

Sports facilities
 Gymnasium and swimming pool 
 Hockey field astroturf and three grass fields
 Athletic track 
 Basketball courts
 100 beds hostel

Hockey stadium 
The Shilaroo Hockey Stadium was constructed in 2010 and maintained by Sports Authority of India. It has modern facilities for hockey like synthetic turf, etc.

See also 
 Lakshmibai National University of Physical Education 
 National Institute of Sports
 National Sports University

References

Universities and colleges in Himachal Pradesh
Sport schools in India
1984 establishments in Himachal Pradesh
Tourist attractions in Shimla
Sports venues completed in 1984
Educational institutions established in 1984
Sports venues in Himachal Pradesh
20th-century architecture in India